D.P. (an acronym for Deserter Pursuit) is a South Korean streaming television series directed by Han Jun-hee, from a screenplay by Kim Bo-tong and Han, based on the Lezhin webtoon D.P Dog's Day by Kim. The series stars Jung Hae-in, Koo Kyo-hwan, Kim Sung-kyun, and Son Suk-ku. It premiered in six parts on Netflix on August 27, 2021. The second season is scheduled to be released in 2023.

On December 14, 2021, a second season was confirmed.

Synopsis
Set in 2014, D.P. tells the story of a team of Korean military police with their mission to catch deserters.

The series magnifies the undesirable nature of the military, especially within a South Korean context. The widespread bullying and hazing as well as the mindset for the "survival of the fittest" are rife, with those presumed the “weakest” thrown to the bottom of the pile and served horrifying experiences at the hands of their superiors and compatriots.

Private Ahn Joon-ho and Corporal Han Ho-yul both team up to find the deserters, and end up in an adventurous journey.

Cast

Main
 Jung Hae-in as Private Ahn Joon-ho
 Koo Kyo-hwan as Corporal Han Ho-yeol
 Kim Sung-kyun as Sergeant First Class Park Beom-gu
 Son Suk-ku as Captain Im Ji-sup
Season 2
 Ji Jin-Hee as Gu Ja-woon
 Kim Ji-Hyun as Lieutenant Colonel Seo-eun

Supporting
 Cho Hyun-chul as Jo Suk-bong
 Shin Seung-ho as Hwang Jang-soo
 Park Se-joon as Heo Ki-young
 Park Jung-woo as Shin Woo-suk
 Kim Dong-young as Choi Joon-mok
 Lee Jun-young as Jung Hyun-min
 Choi Joon-young as Heo Chi-do
 Moon Sang-hoon as Kim Roo-ri
 Hyun Bong-sik as Chun Yong-duk
 Hong Kyung as Ryu Yi-kang
 Bae Yoo-ram as Kim Kyu
 Oh Min-ae as Jun-mok's mother
 Song Duk-ho as Lee Jae-chang
 Han Woo-yul as Tae Sung-gon
 Lee Yeon as Ahn Soo-jin, Joon-ho's younger sister
 Joo Jong-hyuk as Lee Hyo-sang

Guest

 Go Kyung-pyo as Corporal Park Sung-woo (Ep. 1)
 Kwon Hae-hyo as Ahn Joon-ho's father (Eps. 1, 3–4)
 Lee Seol as Shin Woo-seok's sister (Eps. 1 & 6)
 Lee Joong-ok as an hanjeungmak employee (Ep. 2)
Won Ji-an as Moon Young-ok (Ep.3)

Episodes

Season 1 (2021)

Production

Development
In late June 2020, Lezhin Entertainment officially announced that Lezhin Studio and Homemade Film would co-produce a 6-part adaptation of the hit webtoon D.P: Dog Days by Kim Bo-tong, to be released exclusively through Netflix. The story is based on Kim's own experience during his mandatory military service.

Director and co-writer Han Jun-hee had wanted to work on the webtoon's adaptation "for five or six years [before he] finally got a chance" to do so. Though Ahn Joon-ho is a Corporal in the webtoon, Han wanted him to be a Private in the series so people could "resonate with the story and consider Joon-ho as a friend who just started his military service."

Casting
On September 3, 2020, Jung Hae-in, Koo Kyo-hwan, Kim Sung-kyun and Son Suk-ku were confirmed to star in the series. Koo's character does not appear in the webtoon, which he found "hard but exciting to portray a character exclusive to the series." To prepare for his role, Koo received help from his road manager who was part of the D.P. team during his military service. As for Jung, he practiced boxing for three months before filming began, in order to do his own action scenes.

Kim Bo-tong, who wrote the webtoon and co-wrote the series, commented that he "never dreamed of such a cast. They fit so perfectly into their roles that it seems like the roles were written for them."

Filming
Principal photography began in the summer of 2020.

Reception

Audience viewership
Following its release, the series topped Netflix's Top 10 in South Korea.

Critical response
William Schwartz of HanCinema praised Jung Hae-in's acting, commenting that he "is sublime here, in a brooding cinematic role radically different from the romances he's better known for." He added that "D.P. is worth watching, not just by people curious what South Korean mandatory military service is really like, but anyone from any country who's seriously thinking about joining up."

Pierce Conran of the South China Morning Post gave the series a 4.5/5 rating, noting that "D.P. hits home with a story that spans the past and present, as it acknowledges that yesterday’s problems can still be today’s." He also praised the cinematography as well as Jung and Koo's "electric chemistry". Daniel Hart of Ready Steady Cut also rated the series 4.5 stars out of 5, describing it as "the finest K-Drama mini-series this year."

Greg Wheeler of The Review Geek rated the series 4.3/5, noting that "D.P. is a stunning Korean drama [which] takes an unflinching look at bullying, the effect it has on mental health and larger societal questions about the mandatory military service in Korea" and praising the series for its "impressive" cinematography and for the way it "explore[s] a very sensitive and prevalent topic in a raw, artistic and unflinching way."

In a mixed review, Hidzir Junaini of NME gave the series a 3/5 rating, commenting that "Kim Bo-tong and Han Jun-hee must be given credit for how this series tackles such extraordinarily difficult and tragic subject matter with compassion and sensitivity", and praising the "uniformly excellent performances, splendid cinematography, addictive pacing, and intrepid commitment to shedding light on the appalling culture of bullying in the military", but criticizing the "weak characterization [of the] three main leads" as well as the "ludicrous escalation of events during its climax, which suddenly turns a fairly grounded show into a melodramatic action thriller."

Future
On September 1, 2021, Jung Hae-in revealed during an interview that he is "looking forward to season 2, and the director and writer are already writing the script." On May 31, 2022, Netflix officially announced the production of the season 2 with all four main cast reprising their roles.

Accolades

References

External links
 
 
 

Korean-language Netflix original programming
2021 South Korean television series debuts
South Korean web series
South Korean military television series
South Korean pre-produced television series
Television shows based on South Korean webtoons
Works about armies
Television series set in 2014